Thomas Riedl (born 18 June 1976) is a German former footballer who played as a defensive midfielder. He is the son of Hannes Riedl, who played for 1. FC Kaiserslautern in the 1970s.

Riedl is a youth exponent of hometown club 1. FC Kaiserslautern. At Kaiserslautern, he played from 1994 to 1999, winning the 1997–98 Bundesliga and the 1995–96 DFB-Pokal. Following a two-year stint at TSV 1860 Munich, he re-joined Kaiserlautern in 2001 before the club in 2006 for Austrian side SK Austria Kärnten where remained for four years and spent a half-season on loan at SAK Klagenfurt in 2009. Towards the end of his career, he returned to Germany playing for lower league clubs Eintracht Trier, SC Idar-Oberstein, and FK Pirmasens.

At international level, Riedl earned one cap playing for the Germany U-21 team.

Honours
 Bundesliga: 1997–98
 DFB-Pokal: 1995–96; finalist: 2002–03

References

External links
 
 

1976 births
Living people
German footballers
Germany B international footballers
Germany under-21 international footballers
1. FC Kaiserslautern II players
1. FC Kaiserslautern players
TSV 1860 Munich players
SV Eintracht Trier 05 players
Bundesliga players
2. Bundesliga players
Association football midfielders
FK Pirmasens players